Nottingham Forest is an English professional football club based in Nottingham. The club's involvement in European competition dates back to the 1960s.

European
English football clubs in international competitions